Funeral cosmetology, also known as mortuary makeup or restorative arts, sometimes known by the older name desairology, are activities related to the practice of viewing a deceased person in their open casket prior to burial. If a family requests a viewing, the funeral director will discuss with the family how they would like the decedent to appear, and even ask the family to provide a reference photo of the deceased. This photo may be given to the desairologist. A decedent's usual hairdresser may also be called upon.

In the United States 
The U.S. Occupational Safety and Health Administration's official view is that while no certification is required to practice funeral cosmetology, a person must be a licensed cosmetologist, funeral director, or embalmer to perform cosmetic services on deceased persons. In many funeral homes, unless the family requests special services or a certain cosmetologist, funeral home personnel do the necessary cosmetic preparations.

According to the National Accrediting Commission of Cosmetology Arts and Sciences (NACCAS), no schools in the United States currently offer specific programs of study for mortuary cosmetologists, however, many schools offer classes on mortuary services as part of their cosmetology curriculum. States don’t require special licensing for mortuary cosmetologists beyond the standard cosmetology license, which is a requirement for cosmetologists in all 50 U.S. states.

References

See also 
 Embalming

External links

Personal care and service occupations
Cosmetics